In Spain, the Spanish Socialist Workers' Party (PSOE) has three local chapters that use the initialism PSC-PSOE. PSC-PSOE is the Spanish- and Catalan-language initialism for the name of those chapters in these autonomous communities:

Socialist Party of the Canaries, the PSOE regional federation in the region of the Canary Islands
Socialist Party of Cantabria, the PSOE regional federation in the region of Cantabria
 Socialists' Party of Catalonia, the PSOE regional federation in the region of Catalonia

Notes